Hammad Farooqui is a Pakistani actor and model. He is known for his roles in dramas Darr Khuda Say, Gumrah, Ustani Jee, Main Agar Chup Hoon, Yeh Raha Dil and Kahin Deep Jaley. He is the recipient of Hum Award for Best Soap Actor for his performance in Haya Ke Daaman Main.

Career
Hammad made his debut as an actor in 2009. He appeared in dramas Meri Maa, Ishqaaway, Maryam, Ustani Jee and Haya Ke Daaman Main. Then he appeared in dramas Sangdil, Kitni Girhain Baaki Hain (season 2), Gumrah, Sangsar and Yeh Raha Dil. Since then he appeared in dramas Piya Naam Ka Diya, Darr Khuda Say, Kahin Deep Jaley, Mein Jeena Chahti Hoon, Rabba Mainu Maaf Kareen and Main Agar Chup Hoon.

Personal life
Hammad married Sanodia in 2017 and they have one child together. Hammad's brother Faraz is also an actor.

Filmography

Television

Telefilm

Film

Awards and nominations

References

External links
 
 

Living people
21st-century Pakistani male actors
Pakistani male television actors
Pakistani male film actors
Year of birth missing (living people)